The cuisine of the Southern United States encompasses diverse food traditions of several regions, including Tidewater, Appalachian, Lowcountry, Cajun, Creole, and Floribbean cuisine. In recent history, elements of Southern cuisine have spread to other parts the United States, influencing other types of American cuisine.

Many elements of Southern cooking—tomatoes, squash, corn (and its derivatives, such as hominy and grits), and deep-pit barbecuing—are borrowings from indigenous peoples of the region (e.g., Cherokee, Caddo, Choctaw, and Seminole). From the Old World, European colonists introduced sugar, flour, milk, eggs, and livestock, along with a number of vegetables; meanwhile, enslaved West Africans trafficked to the North American colonies through the Atlantic slave trade introduced black-eyed peas, okra, eggplant, sesame, sorghum, melons, and various spices. Rice also became prominent in many dishes in the Lowcountry region of South Carolina due to the fact that the enslaved people who settled the region (now known as the Gullah people), were already quite familiar with the crop.

Many Southern foodways are local adaptations of Old World traditions. In Appalachia, many Southern dishes are Scottish or British Border in origin. For instance, the South's fondness for a full breakfast derives from the British full breakfast or fry-up. Pork, once considered informally taboo in Scotland, has taken the place of lamb and mutton. Instead of chopped oats, Southerners have traditionally eaten grits, a porridge normally made from coarsely ground maize. 

Certain regions have been infused with different Old World traditions. Louisiana Creole cuisine draws upon vernacular French cuisine, West African cuisine, and Spanish cuisine; Floribbean cuisine is Spanish-based with obvious Caribbean influences; and Tex-Mex has considerable Mexican and Native American influences with its abundant use of New World vegetables (e.g. corn, tomatoes, squash, and peppers) and barbecued meat. In Southern Louisiana, West African influences have persisted in dishes such as gumbo, jambalaya, and red beans and rice.

Sources

Interest in American regional cooking continued to grow after the Civil War, especially as concerning the traditions of the Southern United States. Many new cookbooks were added to the existing body of literature. Some of these fell within the scope of domestic manuals offering instruction to southern homemakers to the maintenance of homes in the new post-Slavery era. Some of these works like Mary Stuart Smith's Virginia Cookery Book (1885) aimed to preserve the culinary heritage of the South.

Traditional Southern dishes

A traditional Southern meal is pan-fried chicken, field peas (such as black-eyed peas), greens (such as collard greens, mustard greens, turnip greens, or poke sallet), mashed potatoes, cornbread or corn pone, sweet tea, and dessert—typically a pie (sweet potato, chess, shoofly, pecan, and peach are the most common), or a cobbler (peach, blackberry, sometimes apple in Kentucky or Appalachia).

Other Southern foods include grits, country ham, hushpuppies, beignets (in the Gulf South), Southern styles of succotash, brisket, meatloaf, chicken fried steak, buttermilk biscuits (may be served with butter, jelly, fruit preserves, honey, gravy or sorghum molasses), pimento cheese, boiled or baked sweet potatoes, pit barbecue, fried catfish, fried green tomatoes, macaroni and cheese, bread pudding, okra (principally dredged in cornmeal and fried, but also steamed, stewed, sauteed, or pickled), butter beans, and pinto beans.

Barbecue
"White barbecue sauce" made with mayonnaise, pepper and vinegar is an Alabama specialty usually served with smoked barbecue chicken.

"Yellow barbecue sauce" made with a mustard base is unique to South Carolina and has roots in mass immigration of Germans to the area in the mid 1700s.

Fried chicken
Fried chicken is among the region's best-known exports. It is believed that the Scots, and later Scottish immigrants to many southern states had a tradition of deep frying chicken in fat, unlike their English counterparts who baked or boiled chicken. However, some sources trace the origin of fried chicken to Southern and Western England where most of the Early settlers to the South came from. They conclude that Southern and Western England had a strong tradition of frying, simmering, and sautéing meats in a skillet as opposed to East Anglia which favored baking and boiling meats.

Coming from Africa, African Americans also brought their methods of frying foods with them. Frying was a common method for food preparation for slaves since it was quick and accessible. During slavery in the 1800s, as the only animals slaves were allowed to own were yard chickens, African Americans began frying their chicken using the same methods they used to fry other foods. Later in the 1800s, before the Civil War, fried chicken could also be sold by enslaved people to raise money to buy their freedom. Soon, this led to the association of African-Americans in the South and fried chicken.

Fried chicken was popularized by African Americans and this helped it become one of the most popular and important southern cuisines in the United States. The importance of fried chicken to southern cuisine is apparent through the multiple traditions and different adaptations of fried chicken, such as KFC; Nashville's Prince's Hot Chicken Shack; or the Cajun-inspired Bojangles' Famous Chicken 'n Biscuits and Popeyes Chicken.

Pork and ham
Pork is an integral part of the cuisine. Stuffed ham is served in Southern Maryland. A traditional holiday get-together featuring whole hog barbecue is known in Virginia and the Carolinas as a "pig pickin'".

Green beans are often flavored with bacon and salt pork, turnip greens are stewed with pork and served with vinegar, ham biscuits (biscuits cut in half with slices of salt ham served between the halves) often accompany breakfast, and ham with red-eye gravy or country gravy is a common dinner dish.

Country ham, a heavily salt-cured ham, is common across the Southern United States, with the most well-known being the Virginia-originating Smithfield ham.

Vegetables
Southern meals sometimes consist only of vegetables, with a little meat (especially salt pork) used in cooking but with no meat dish served. "Beans and greens"—white or brown beans served alongside a "mess" of greens stewed with a little bacon—is a traditional meal in many parts of the South. (Turnip greens are the typical greens for such a meal; they're cooked with some diced turnip and a piece of fatback.)

Other low-meat Southern meals include beans and cornbread—the beans being pinto beans stewed with ham or bacon—and Hoppin' John (black-eyed peas, rice, onions, red or green pepper, and bacon).

Cabbage is largely used as the basis of coleslaw, both as a side dish and on a variety of barbecued and fried meats.<ref>Villas, James. The Glory of Southern Cooking", John Wiley & Sons, Hoboken, NJ, 2007, p. 73</ref> Sauteéd red cabbage, flavored with vinegar and sugar, is popular in German-influenced areas of the South such as central Texas.

Butternut squash is common in winter, often prepared as a roasted casserole with butter and honey. Other typical vegetable sides include collard greens and congealed salads. Double stuffed potatoes with barbecue pork, cheddar cheese, cream cheese, mayonnaise and chives are served at barbecue restaurants throughout the South.

Rice
Country Captain is a regional dish of curry chicken and rice that dates back to at least the 1920s. It became well known after a Columbus, Georgia cook served the dish to then President Franklin D. Roosevelt. George Patton once said "If you can't give me a party and have Country Captain, meet me at the train with a bucket of it."

Sweets and pastries
Georgia is known for peach cultivation and variations of Peach melba are commonly served as desserts. Chess pie is a traditional pastry made with eggs, butter and sugar or molasses. Bananas foster is a specialty of New Orleans.

Seafood
Gulf seafood like black grouper, shrimp and swordfish can be found, and "channel catfish" (Ictalurus punctatus) farmed locally in the Mississippi Delta region is especially popular in Oxford, Mississippi. Fried catfish battered in cornmeal is commonly served at local establishments with hot sauce and a side of fries and coleslaw. Oysters Rockefeller is a New Orleans specialty, believed to have originated in the state. Creole dishes like gumbo and jambalaya often feature crawfish, oysters, blue crab and shrimp.

Southern food in restaurants

Chains serving Southern foods—often along with American comfort food—have had great success; many have spread across the country or across the world, while others have chosen to stay in the South. Pit barbecue is popular all over the American South; unlike the rest of the country, most of the rural South has locally owned, non-franchise pit-barbecue restaurants, many serving the regional style of barbecue instead of the nationally predominant Kansas City style. Family-style restaurants serving Southern cuisine are common throughout the South, and range from the humble and down-home to the decidedly upscale. 

By region

Southern cuisine varies widely by region. Generally speaking:

Appalachian areas have many ramps (a variety of wild onion) and berries. Appalachia uses butter extensively but makes little use of cheese, and eats more wild game (as well as wild fruits and vegetables) than the rest of the South; apples, oats, and potatoes are also common in Appalachian cuisine, since the mountains are cooler and drier than the lowlands.
 The Upper South favors pork and whiskey; the Low Country (the coast, especially coastal Georgia and coastal South Carolina) favors seafood, rice, and grits.
 Texas and Oklahoma tend to prefer beef; the rest of the South prefers pork.
 Arkansas is the top rice-producing state in the nation. It produces Riceland rice and sweet corn, both of which are staples of the cuisine of Southeastern Arkansas. Arkansas is also noted for catfish, pork barbecue at restaurants, and chicken.
 Florida is home of the Key lime pie and swamp cabbage. Orange juice is the well-known beverage of the state. It has a large beef industry, as well as a seafood industry, and both are reflected in local cuisine. Rock Shrimp is beloved on the coast, while beef is common in the state's interior. Due to its long-term economic and trading relationship with the rest of the Caribbean, a particular form of fusion cuisine known as Floribbean cuisine has developed in the state, a fusion of traditional southern food with Caribbean cuisine, often relying on both peppers and fruit to flavor meat dishes.
 Georgia is known for its peaches, pecans, peanuts, and Vidalia onions.
 In Southern Louisiana, there is Cajun and Creole cuisine. Louisiana is the largest supplier of crawfish in the U.S.
 Kentucky is famous for Burgoo, beer cheese, and the Hot Brown. Kentucky is also known for KFC and fried chicken.
 Maryland and Virginia are known for their blue and soft-shell crabs, and Smith Island Cake.
 Mississippi and Alabama produce the most catfish in the United States.
 Carolina-style barbecue is common in North Carolina, South Carolina, and Virginia, and is made traditionally from pulled-pork and a vinegar-based sauce.
 Oklahoma has a reputation for many grain- and bean-based dishes, such as "cornbread and beans" or the breakfast dish biscuits and gravy. Mississippi specializes in farm-raised catfish, found in traditional "fish houses" throughout the state.
 In the coastal areas of South Carolina, rice was an important crop, leading to local specialties like "Hoppin' John" (a mixture of rice and black-eyed peas flavored with salt pork) and Charleston red rice.
 Tennessee is known for its country ham and Memphis is known for several famous barbecue restaurants and a major barbecue cooking competition held in May. Memphis barbecue usually consists of pork and is distinct for its dry rub. No sauce is applied during the cooking process instead flavor is gained from the rub when cooking. Nashville is known for its famous hot chicken from places like Prince's Hot Chicken Shack, Bolton's Hot Chicken, Hattie B's, and Biscuit Love. Nashville is also home to the restaurant Husk run by world-class chef Sean Brock. 
 Texas specializes in barbecue, chili, and Southern cuisine as well as a regional variation of Mexican food unique to Texas called Tex-Mex.
 Virginia produces Smithfield ham and Virginia peanuts. Brunswick stew, which originated in the town of Brunswick, Virginia is also popular.  The state's proximity to the Chesapeake Bay and the ideal conditions of the Rappahannock River, makes oysters a popular dish in Virginia, be they served fried, raw, or in a cream-based oyster stew.
 West Virginia is the area where pepperoni rolls are most popular, which typically consists of a white bread roll with pepperoni baked in the middle. The fats in the pepperoni melt into the bread, giving the bread an extra dimension of flavor. Other ingredients are sometimes added, such as cheese, peppers, or melted butter on the top.

Louisiana Creole cuisine

Southern Louisiana is geographically part of the South, but its cuisine is probably best understood as having only mild Southern influences. Creole cuisine makes good use of many coastal animals—crawfish (commonly called crayfish outside the region), crab, oysters, shrimp, and saltwater fish. Mirliton (chayote squash), is popular in Louisiana. Coffee blended with Chicory is sometimes preferred over pure ground—especially as an accompaniment to beignets.

Lowcountry cuisine

The Lowcountry region of the coastal Carolinas and Georgia shares many of the same food resources as the Upper Gulf Coast: fish, shrimp, oysters, rice, and okra. It also displays some similarities to Creole and Cajun cuisines.

Appalachian cuisine

Because of its geographic location, Appalachia cuisine offers a wide range of ingredients and products that can be transformed using traditional methods and contemporary applications. Staples of Appalachian cuisine that are common in other regional cuisines of the south include coconut cream cake, peanut brittle, sweet potato casserole, pork chops, biscuits and gravy, and chicken and dumplings. Basic soul food dishes like collard greens, hominy, cracklings and ham hocks are also common to the Appalachian kitchen.

European fruits—especially apples and pears—can grow in the mountains, and sweet fried apples are a common side dish. Appalachian cuisine also makes use of berries, both native and European, and some parts of the mountains are high enough or far enough north that sugar maple grows there—allowing for maple syrup and maple sugar production. Wild morel mushrooms and ramps (similar to scallions and leeks) are often collected; there are even festivals dedicated to ramps, and they figure in some Appalachian fairy tales. The diet included corn, beans, squash, mixed pickles, milk, cheeses, butter, cream, tea, and coffee.

19th-century meals included greens fried in bear grease, elk backstrap steaks and venison stew. Ashcakes were cornbread cooked directly on hearth coals. Cornbread was the most common bread in the mountains, and still remains a staple.

Salt, a necessity for life, was always available (much of it coming from Saltville, Virginia), and local seasonings like spicebush were certainly known and used; but the only other seasonings used in the mountains are black pepper and flaked red pepper, along with a little use of cinnamon, nutmeg, and cloves around Christmas.

Coffee, drunk without milk and only lightly sweetened, is a basic drink in Appalachia, often consumed with every meal; in wartime, chicory was widely used as a coffee substitute.

Rice and cane sugar, grown further south, were not easy to come by in Appalachia and generally sorghum, honey and maple syrup were used as sweetener in local dishes. Travel distances, conditions, and poor roads limited most early settlements to foods that could be grown or produced locally.

For farmers, pigs and chickens were the primary source of meat, with many farmers maintaining their own smokehouses to produce a variety of hams, bacon, and sausages. Seafood, beyond the occasionally locally caught fresh-water fish (pan-fried catfish is much loved, as is trout in the mountains of western North Carolina, East Tennessee, and Southwest Virginia) and crawfish, were unavailable until modern times.

However, Appalachia did offer a wide variety of wild game, with venison, rabbit and squirrel particularly common, thus helping to compensate for distance from major cities and transportation networks. The popularity of hunting and fishing in Appalachia means that game and fresh-water fish were often staples of the table. Deer, wild turkey, grouse and other game birds are hunted and utilized in many recipes from barbecue to curing and jerky.

Home canning, of both garden and foraged foods, is a strong tradition in Appalachia as well; mason jars are an everyday sight in mountain life; the most common canned foods are savory vegetables: green beans (half-runners, snaps), shelly beans (green beans that were more mature and had ripe beans along with the green husks), and tomatoes, as well as jam, jelly and local fruits.

Dried pinto beans are a major staple food during the winter months, used to make the ubiquitous ham-flavored bean soup usually called soup beans. Kieffer pears and apple varietals are used to make pear butter and apple butter.

Also popular are bread and butter pickles, fried mustard greens with vinegar, pickled beets, chow-chow (commonly called "chow"), a relish known as corn ketchup and fried green tomatoes; tomatoes are also used in tomato gravy, a variant of sausage gravy with a thinner, lighter roux. A variety of wild fruits like pawpaws, wild blackberries, and persimmons are also commonly available in Appalachia as well.

As wheat flour and baking powder/baking soda became available in the late 19th century, buttermilk biscuits became popular. Today, buttermilk biscuits and sausage gravy are the classic Appalachian breakfast; they are also a common breakfast everywhere where Appalachian people have emigrated. Both North Carolina and West Virginia have statewide biscuit chain restaurants; many Southern or originally-Southern chains offer biscuits and gravy, and when McDonald's introduced a new breakfast menu selling either Egg McMuffins (with English muffins) or a variant with biscuits, the biscuit zone was practically a map of the South with the exception of Virginia, Maryland, and Florida.

The gravy for biscuits and gravy is typically sausage or sawmill, not the red-eye gravy (made with coffee) used in the lowland South. Pork drippings from frying sausage, bacon, and other types of pan-fried pork are collected and saved, used for making gravy and in greasing cast-iron cookware. (Note that Appalachia is overwhelmingly Protestant, the Catholic prohibition on meat-eating during Lent had no impact on Appalachian cuisine.)

Chicken and dumplings and fried chicken remain much-loved dishes. Cornbread, corn pone, hominy grits, mush, cornbread pudding and hominy stew are also quite common foods, as corn is the primary grain grown in the Appalachian hills and mountains, but are less common than in the past.

See also

Bahamian cuisine
Barbecue
Cuisine of the Southwestern United States
Cuisine of the United States
Liberian cuisine
List of foods of the Southern United States
Soul food
Southern Food and Beverage Museum
Tex-Mex cuisine
Memphis-style barbecue
Texan cuisine
Cuisine of New Orleans
Cuisine of Kentucky
Cuisine of Houston
Cuisine of Atlanta

References

 Bowen, Carl. Southern-Recipes. 2010. .
 Domine, David. 111 Fabulous Food Finds: Best Bites in the Bluegrass. McClanahan Publishing House, 2011. .
 Domine, David. Adventures in New Kentucky Cooking with the Bluegrass Peasant. McClanahan Publishing House, 2007. .
 Domine, David. Splash of Bourbon, Kentucky's Spirit. McClanahan Publishing House, 2010. 
 Harris, Jessica. On the Side: More than 100 Recipes for the Sides, Salads, and Condiments That Make the Meal. Simon & Schuster, 2004. .
 The Junior League of Charleston. Charleston Receipts. Wimmer Brothers, 1950. .
 Lewis, Edna and Peacock, Scott. The Gift of Southern Cooking: Recipes and Revelations from Two Great American Cook. Knopf, 2003. .
 Neal, Bill. Bill Neal's Southern Cooking. University of North Carolina Press, 1989. .
 Neal, Bill. Biscuits, Spoonbread, and Sweet Potato Pie. University of North Carolina Press, 2003. .
 Neal, Bill. Good Old Grits Cookbook. Workman Publishing Company, 1991. .
 Snow, Constance. Gulf Coast Kitchens. Clarkson Potter/Publishers, 2003. .
Sohn, Mark F. Appalachian Home Cooking History, Culture, & Recipes Lexington: University Press of Kentucky. 2005. 
 Taylor, John. Hoppin' John's Lowcountry Cooking. 1992. .
 Walter, Eugene. American Cooking: Southern Style. New York: Time Life Books, 1971.

Further reading
 
 Ferris, Marcie Cohen (2014). The Edible South: The Power of Food and the Making of an American Region.'' Chapel Hill, NC: University of North Carolina Press.

External links
 Southern Foodways Alliance
 Southern Food & Beverage Museum

 
American cuisine by region
Cuisine